Charly Clive is an English actress, known for her role as Marnie in the television series Pure. In 2015, aged 20, after being diagnosed with a brain tumor, she wrote about her experience in a sellout comedy show called Britney, which was named after her brain tumor, which in turn was named after singer Britney Spears: “I needed it to be iconic, and there is nobody more iconic than Britney. If I was going to get a tumour, then she'd have to be a little bit fabulous, and so Britney was the one".

She was nominated as one of the Screen Stars of Tomorrow in 2018. A television sitcom adaptation of Britney debuted on BBC Three in November 2021 to critical acclaim.

Filmography

Film

Television

Music video

Stage

References

External links
 
 

Living people
English comedians
English musical theatre actresses
English stage actresses
English television actresses
Year of birth missing (living people)